The University of Toronto Department of Mathematics is an academic department within the Faculty of Arts and Science at the University of Toronto. It is located at the university's main campus at the Bahen Centre for Information Technology.

The University of Toronto was ranked first in Canada for Mathematics in 2018 by the QS World University Rankings, the Times Higher Education World University Rankings, and the Maclean's University Rankings.

History
For most of the second half of the 19th century, the University of Toronto was the only English-language university in Canada to offer programs with specializations, one being in mathematics and natural philosophy. The university launched its mathematics program in 1877, which became a model for the rest of Canada during the first half of the 20th century. The Mathematical and Physical Society was founded in 1882 as a mathematics student society.

In the early 20th century, the department became the first in North American to explore the field of actuarial science. At the same time, the University of Toronto's mathematics department increasingly took the lead on mathematical research in Canada. Faculty member John Charles Fields, appointed professor in 1902, was perhaps the most important in developing research at Toronto. Fields organized the 1924 International Congress of Mathematicians held in Toronto, and would later found the Fields Medal.

Fields's student, Samuel Beatty, was the first mathematics Ph.D. in Canada, obtaining his degree in 1915 (Beatty would later serve as head of the mathematics department and first president of the Canadian Mathematical Society in 1945). In the next twenty years, Toronto was to produce eight doctorates in mathematics, two of them women.

The Department's competitive mathematics team, consisting of Irving Kaplansky, Nathan Mendelsohn and John Coleman, won first place in the first year of the William Lowell Putnam Mathematical Competition in 1938. While competition rules prevented the University of Toronto from entering a team the following year, the team in won again in 1940, 1942 and 1946.

Meanwhile, the first Canadian mathematics journal, Canadian Journal of Mathematics, began publication by the University of Toronto Press in 1949, with faculty members Harold Coxeter and Gilbert de Beauregard Robinson as Editor-in-Chief and Managing Editor, respectively.

The department moved from University College to Baldwin House in 1958, and then to Sidney Smith Hall upon its completion in 1961. The statistics sub-department, first established in 1947, became a separate department in 1978.

The department was one of the founders of the Fields Institute for Research in Mathematical Sciences in 1991. Initially based at the University of Waterloo, the institute is now located at the University of Toronto. In 2006, the Department of Mathematics moved to the sixth floor of the Bahen Centre for Information Technology, located directly behind the Fields Institute.

Academics

Awards and medals
Of the 120 current Fellows of the Royal Society of Canada in the discipline of Mathematics and Computer Sciences, 21 (or 18%) are members of the University of Toronto's Department of Mathematics.

A number of individuals affiliated with the department have won international prizes for their research in mathematics, including the Fields Medal, the Wolf Prize, the Steele Prize, the Cole Prize, the Clay Research Award, and the Sloan Fellowship.

Rankings
In the 2018 QS World University Rankings, the University of Toronto was ranked nineteenth in the world in the subject of Mathematics. The university was ranked first in Canada for Mathematics in 2018 by the Maclean's University Rankings, the Times Higher Education World University Rankings, and the QS World University Rankings.

Notable members

Alumni
Notable alumni of the Department include Arthur Dempster, Clifford Dowker, Donald Fraser, Irving Kaplansky, Walter Kohn, J. Carson Mark (Ph.D. 1938), Nathan Mendelsohn, John Mighton (Ph.D. 2000), Robert Moody (Ph.D. 1966), Cathleen Morawetz, Gordon Slade, Robert Steinberg (Ph.D. 1948), James Stewart (Ph.D. 1967), and Albert Tucker.

Current members

 James Arthur ; CRM-Fields-PIMS Prize (1997), Wolf Prize (2015), Steele Prize (2017)
 Edward Barbeau
 Dror Bar-Natan
 Edward Bierstone 
 Stephen Cook ; Turing Award (1982), CRM-Fields-PIMS Prize (1999) 
 Derek Corneil
 Chandler Davis
 George Elliott 
 John Friedlander 
 Lisa Jeffrey 
 Victor Ivrii 
 Yael Karshon
 Boris Khesin
 Askold Khovanskii 
 Stephen Kudla ; Sloan Fellowship (1981)
 Robert McCann 
 Eckhard Meinrenken 
 Pierre Milman 
 Kumar Murty 
 Alexander Nabutovsky
 Toniann Pitassi
 Jeremy Quastel ; Sloan Fellowship (1996–98), CRM-Fields-PIMS Prize (2018)
 Jeff Rosenthal 
 Arul Shankar; Sloan Fellowship (2018)
 Israel Sigal 
 Catherine Sulem 
 Stevo Todorčević ; CRM-Fields-PIMS Prize (2012)
 Jacob Tsimerman

Former members

 Frederick Atkinson , Professor (1960–2002)
 Artur Avila, Visitor (2011); Fields Medal (2014)
 Samuel Beatty, Professor (1911–33) and Chair (1934–52)
 Richard Brauer, Professor (1935–48); Cole Prize (1949)
 James Colliander, Professor (2001–2015); Sloan Fellowship (2003)
 Harold Coxeter , Professor (1936–80); CRM-Fields-PIMS Prize (1995), Sylvester Medal (1997)
 Arthur Dempster, Lecturer (1957–58)
 Gabriel Andrew Dirac, Lecturer (1952–53)
 George Duff , Professor (1952–92) and Chair (1968–75)
 John Charles Fields , Professor (1902–32)
 Larry Guth, Assistant Professor (2008–11); Clay Research Award (2015)
 Israel Halperin , Professor (1966–78)
 Hans Heilbronn , Professor (1964–75)
 Leopold Infeld, Professor (1938–50)
 William Kahan, Professor (1963–70); Turing Award (1989)
 Cecilia Krieger, Professor (1928–69)
 George Lorentz, Assistant Professor (1950–54); Humboldt Prize (1973)
 Louis Mordell , Lecturer (1953–55); Smith's Prize (1912), De Morgan Medal (1941), Sylvester Medal (1949)
 Abraham Robinson, Professor (1952–57)
 Gilbert de Beauregard Robinson , Professor (1929–30, 1931–71)
 Ralph Gordon Stanton, Assistant Professor (1950–58)
 John Synge , Assistant Professor (1920–25, 1930–43)
 William Tutte , Associate Professor (1948–62); CRM-Fields-PIMS Prize (2001)
 Maria Wonenburger, Associate Professor (1962–66)
 Maciej Zworski , Professor (1995–2000)

See also
 Fields Institute for Research in Mathematical Sciences

References

1877 establishments in Ontario
Research institutes in Canada
Toronto
University departments in Canada
University of Toronto